The Government of the 9th Dáil was successively the 8th Executive Council of the Irish Free State (21 July – 29 December 1937) and the 1st Government of Ireland (29 December 1937 – 30 June 1938). They were led by Éamon de Valera, first as President of the Executive Council and then as Taoiseach. It was formed after the 1937 general election held on 1 July, the same day the new Constitution of Ireland was approved in a plebiscite. Fianna Fáil were continuing in office as a single-party government as they had since the 1932 general election.

The 8th Executive Council lasted for  days and the 1st Government lasted for  days.

8th Executive Council of the Irish Free State

Election of President of the Executive Council
The 9th Dáil first met on 21 July 1937. In the debate on the election of the President of the Executive Council, Fianna Fáil leader and outgoing President Éamon de Valera was proposed, and the motion was approved by 82 votes to 52.

The election took place under Article 53 of the Constitution of the Irish Free State, as amended by the Constitution (Amendment No. 27) Act 1936, which had removed the constitutional role of the Governor-General. It was the only time from December 1922 that the head of government was directly elected by the Dáil only; from December 1922 to December 1936, the nomination of the president of the Executive Council was approved by Dáil for appointment by the Governor-General, and since December 1937, the nomination of the Taoiseach has similarly been approved by the Dáil for appointment by the president of Ireland.

Members of the Executive Council
The members of the Executive Council were proposed by the President after his election and approved by the Dáil for their appointment by him.

Parliamentary Secretaries
On 21 July, the Executive Council appointed Parliamentary Secretaries on the nomination of the President.

1st Government of Ireland

Under Article 56 of the Constitution of Ireland, the 8th Executive Council of the Irish Free State led by Éamon de Valera of Fianna Fáil became the 1st Government of Ireland (29 December 1937 – 30 June 1938). The offices of President of the Executive Council and Vice-President of the Executive Council were abolished, and replaced by the offices of Taoiseach and Tánaiste respectively. There was no fresh approval or appointment of the government and no change in the personnel of the Government.

Parliamentary Secretaries

Foreign relations
The government signed the Anglo-Irish Trade Agreement with the United Kingdom on 25 April 1938, which brought the Anglo-Irish trade war to a close and transferred the Treaty Ports to Ireland. These were the ports of Berehaven, Cóbh and Lough Swilly which had stayed under the control of the United Kingdom after the establishment of the Irish Free State.

See also
Dáil Éireann
Constitution of the Irish Free State
Constitution of Ireland
Politics of the Republic of Ireland

References

Government 09
1937 establishments in Ireland
1938 disestablishments in Ireland
Cabinets established in 1937
Cabinets disestablished in 1938
Minority governments
9th Dáil